San Diego 1904 FC was an American professional soccer team based in San Diego, California, United States. In December 2021, the team was absorbed by Albion San Diego, which effectively took over 1904's membership in the National Independent Soccer Association (NISA).

History
The name 1904 was suggested by a fan, and refers to S and D, the nineteenth and fourth letters of the alphabet (also, the letters S and D resemble the numbers 9 and 0 in the club logo).  Commenters on social media pointed out that the number could also be seen as a reference to a joke in the film Anchorman: The Legend of Ron Burgundy (in which Burgundy falsely asserts that San Diego was "discovered by the Germans in 1904"), leading journalists to suggest that reference may have been intentional.

The club's founders include soccer players Demba Ba and Eden Hazard.

The team was originally announced to make its debut in the North American Soccer League in 2018. However, due to the cancellation of the  2018 NASL season, the expansion team withdrew from the NASL and attempted to reach an agreement to join the United Soccer League in 2019. On June 7, 2018, it was revealed that 1904 FC's exclusive negotiating window had elapsed without agreement in place to join USL. On September 6, 2018, the National Independent Soccer Association (NISA), a planned Division III league, confirmed that San Diego 1904 FC was the league's first member club. NISA has applied to the United States Soccer Federation (U.S. Soccer) for sanctioning as a Division III league to start play in 2019. The club played at 70,561-seat capacity SDCCU Stadium for the Fall 2019 NISA season.

On August 29, 2019, Alexandre Gontran was announced as the club's first head coach.

In the spring, the team announced it would move to Lincoln High School within the city.

On July 28, 2020, the team announced it would go on hiatus for the Fall 2020 NISA season due to the COVID-19 pandemic and un-sustainability that would come from playing behind closed doors. On September 2, NISA and the team both confirmed it would be returning for the Spring 2021 season. This continued into 2021 when the team was announced as one of nine participating teams in both the Spring season and NISA Legends Cup tournament. On July 7, it was announced that 1904 FC had withdrawn from the 2021 NISA Independent Cup, with the league citing that the club had opted for a "different route to prepare for the fall season".
In December 2021, the team announced it would be taken over by Albion San Diego.

Stadiums 

 SDCCU Stadium; San Diego, California (2019)
 Lincoln High School; San Diego, California (2020)
 Chula Vista Elite Athlete Training Center; Chula Vista, California (2021)

Year-by-year

References

External links
 

Association football clubs established in 2017
2017 establishments in California
Soccer clubs in San Diego
Soccer clubs in California
National Independent Soccer Association teams